A jinx is a condition of bad luck possibly by way of a curse.

Jinx or The Jinx may also refer to:

Books
 Jinx (Blackwood novel), 2013 children's novel in a trilogy by Sage Blackwood, and others by that author.
 Jinx (Cabot novel), 2007 young adult novel by Meg Cabot
 Jinx (Image Comics), a graphic novel by Brian Michael Bendis
 The Jinx (magazine), a magazine for mentalists and magicians published by Theodore Annemann

Characters
 Li'l Jinx, an Archie Comics character that goes by just "Jinx" in more recent stories as a grown-up
 Jinx (DC Comics), a DC comic book character
 Jinx (G.I. Joe), a fictional character in the G.I. Joe universe
 Jinx (Known Space), a fictional world in the Known Space universe
 Agent Jinx (James Bond), a character in the James Bond universe
 Jinx, a character in the SpaceCamp universe
 Jinx, the original name of Jerry Mouse, the fictional co-protagonist of the Tom and Jerry cartoons
 Jinx, the Loose Cannon, a character in the League of Legends universe
 Jynx, a fictional species of creatures in Pokémon media
 Mr. Jinx, a character in the Martin Mystère universe

People
 Michael Spinks (born 1956), American boxer nicknamed Jinx
 Jinx Falkenburg (1919–2003), model and talk radio host
 Jinx Dawson, singer with the American band Coven
 Jinx (author), nom de plume of American author and actress Gabriel McClure (born 1994)

Animals 
 Jynx (genus), a Wryneck genus of birds
 Jinx (chimpanzee), the world's first ice skating chimpanzee

Games
 Jinx (game), children's game when two speak the same word or phrase simultaneously
 Jinx (video game), a 2003 PlayStation video game
 Brax (game), a board game also known as Jinx

Computing
 Johannesburg Internet Exchange, South Africa
 Jinx Debugger, a tool for debugging rare concurrency errors

Film and television
 Jinx (film), a 1919 American film
 Jinx (2010 film), a 2010 Indonesian film
 Jinx (TV series), a British child-oriented television series
 The Jinx (miniseries), a 2015 HBO documentary miniseries about Robert Durst

In music
 Jinx (band), a Croatian pop-funk band

Albums
 Jinx, an album by The Jolts
 Jinx, an album by Kammerflimmer Kollektief
 Jinx (Quarashi album), 2002
 Jinx (Rory Gallagher album), 1982
 Jinx (Crumb album), 2019, or the title track

Songs
 "Jinx", a song by Green Day from the 1997 album Nimrod
 "Jinx", a song by DNCE from the 2015 EP Swaay
 "The Jinx", a song by Peter and the Test Tube Babies, 1983
 "Jinx", a song by Tad from the 1991 album 8-Way Santa
 "Jinx", a song by Tuxedomoon from the 1981 album Desire

Other uses
 Jinx (clothing), stylized as J!NX, a Californian apparel company

See also
 Jinxed! (1982 film), an American film starring Bette Midler
 Jinxed (2013 film), a television film
 Jinxx (born 1986), guitarist and violinist for American rock band Black Veil Brides
 Jinkx Monsoon (born 1987), American drag queen
 Jinks (disambiguation)